Linderhof Palace is a Schloss in Germany, in southwest Bavaria near the village of Ettal. It is the smallest of the three palaces built by King Ludwig II of Bavaria and the only one which he lived to see completed.

Development

Ludwig already knew the area around Linderhof from his youth when he had accompanied his father King Maximilian II of Bavaria on his hunting trips in the Bavarian Alps. When Ludwig II became King in 1864, he inherited the so-called Königshäuschen from his father, and in 1869 began enlarging the building. In 1874, he decided to tear down the Königshäuschen and rebuild it on its present-day location in the park. At the same time three new rooms and the staircase were added to the remaining U-shaped complex, and the previous wooden exterior was clad with stone façades. The building was designed in the style of the second rococo-period.  Between 1863 and 1886, a total of 8,460,937 marks was spent constructing Linderhof.

Symbolic background
Although Linderhof is much smaller than Versailles, it is evident that the palace of the French Sun-King Louis XIV (who was an idol for Ludwig) was its inspiration. The staircase, for example, is a reduction of the famous Ambassador's staircase in Versailles, which would be copied in full in Herrenchiemsee. Stylistically, however, the building and its decor take their cues from the mid-18th century Rococo of Louis XV, and the small palace in the Graswang was more directly based on that king's Petit Trianon on the Versailles grounds. The symbol of the sun that can be found everywhere in the decoration of the rooms represents the French notion of absolutism that, for Ludwig, was the perfect incorporation of his ideal of a God-given monarchy with total royal power. Such a monarchy could no longer be realised in Europe in the second half of the nineteenth century.
The bedroom was important to the ceremonial life of an absolute monarch; Louis XIV of France used to give his first (lever) and last audience (coucher) of the day in his bedchamber. In imitation of Versailles, the bedroom is the largest chamber of Linderhof Palace. By facing north, however, the Linderhof bedroom inverts the symbolism of its Versailles counterpart, showing Ludwig's self-image as a "Night-King."

The location of the palace near Ettal Abbey again presents another interesting point. Because of its architecture Ludwig saw the church of the monastery as the room where the holy grail was preserved. This fact connects the idea of a baroque palace to the one of a "medieval" castle such as Neuschwanstein and reminds of the operas of Richard Wagner whose patron Ludwig was. Ludwig was also not unaware that the abbey had been founded by his ancestor and namesake, Emperor Ludwig IV.

The rooms
Linderhof, in comparison to other palaces, has a rather private atmosphere. In fact, there are only four rooms that have a real function.

Hall of Mirrors
This room was used by the king as a drawing room; he enjoyed sitting in the niche, sometimes reading there the whole night. Because Ludwig II used to sleep in the daytime and stay awake in the night, the mirrors created an unimaginable effect for him when they reflected the light of the candles a thousand times. The parallel placement of some mirrors evoke the illusion of a never ending avenue.

Appointments:

The middle table has a top with lapis-lazuli, amethyst and chalcedony inlay work and shows the Bavarian coat of arms in glass mosaic.

A carpet made of ostrich plumes.

An Indian ivory candelabra in the alcove with 16 branches.

Two mantelpieces clad with lapis-lazuli and decorated with gilded bronze ornaments.

Eastern and Western Tapestry Chambers
The two tapestry chambers are almost identical and have no specific function. The western one is sometimes called "Music Room" because of the aeolodion (an instrument combining piano and harmonium) in it. Only the curtains and the coverings on the furniture are real products of the Parisian Gobelin Manufactory. The scenes on the walls are painted on rough canvas in order to imitate real tapestries.

Audience Chamber
The audience chamber is located to the west of the palace and is flanked by the yellow and lilac cabinets. The cabinets were only used as antechambers to the larger rooms. Ludwig II never used this room to hold an audience. This would have been against the private character of Linderhof and the chamber would have been much too small for it. He rather used it as a study where he thought about new building projects. That there is an audience chamber in Linderhof, however, reminds us of the demand of the king on an absolute monarchy.

Appointments:

Two round tables with malachite tops, gift of Grand Duchess Maria Alexandrovna of Russia to King Ludwig II.

Throne baldachin with ostrich feather bunches (as an oriental symbol of royal power).

Dining Room
This room is located to the east and is flanked by the pink and blue cabinets. The pink cabinet, unlike the other cabinets, had a real function. The king used it as a robing room. The dining room is famous for its disappearing dumb-waiter called "Tischlein deck dich". This table was installed so that Ludwig could dine alone here. Yet the staff had to lay the table for at least four persons because it is said that the king used to talk to imaginary people like Louis XV, Mme de Pompadour or Marie Antoinette while he was eating. For Ludwig II enjoyed the company of those people and admired them. You can find portraits of them in the cabinets, and scenes of their lives everywhere in the palace's rooms.

Appointments:

Meissen porcelain centrepiece with china flowers.

Bedchamber
The model for this room was not Louis XIV's bedchamber in Versailles but the bedroom of the Rich Rooms in Munich Residence. This room was completely rebuilt in 1884 and could not be totally finished until the king's death two years later.
The position of the bed itself on steps in the alcove that is closed off by a gilded balustrade gives it the appearance of an altar and thereby glorifies Ludwig II as he slept during the day.

Appointments:

A glass candelabra with 108 candles.

Two console tables of Meissen porcelain (which was the king's favorite china)

The park
The gardens surrounding Linderhof Palace are considered one of the most beautiful creations of historicist garden design, designed by Court Garden Director Carl von Effner. The park combines elements of Renaissance and Baroque formal gardens with landscaped sections that are similar to the English landscape garden.

Linderhof's Linden or The Old "Königslinde"

Deriving from the romantic image of animated nature Ludwig was fascinated by trees. For this reason a tall, 300-year-old linden tree was allowed to remain in the formal gardens although disturbing its symmetry. Historic pictures show a seat in it, where Ludwig used to take his "breakfast" at sunset hidden from view amongst the branches. Contrary to common understanding the tree did not give the palace its name. It came from a family called "Linder" that used to cultivate the farm (in German "Hof" = farm) that over centuries had been in the place where now Linderhof palace is.

Formal gardens
The palace is surrounded by formal gardens that are subdivided into five sections that are decorated with allegoric sculptures of the continents, the seasons and the elements:

The northern part is characterized by a cascade of thirty marble steps. The bottom end of the cascade  is formed by the Neptune fountain and at the top there is a Music Pavilion.

The centre of the western parterre is formed by basin with the gilt figure of "Fama". In the west there is a pavilion with the bust of Louis XIV. In front of it you see a fountain with the gilt sculpture "Amor with dolphins". The garden is decorated with four majolica vases.

The crowning of the eastern parterre is a wooden pavilion containing the bust of Louis XVI. Twenty-four steps below it there is a fountain basin with a gilt sculpture "Amor shooting an arrow". A sculpture of "Venus and Adonis" is placed between the basin and the palace.

The water parterre in front of the palace is dominated by a large basin with the gilt fountain group "Flora and puttos". The fountain's water jet itself is nearly 25 meters high.

The terrace gardens form the southern part of the park and correspond to the cascade in the north. On the landing of the first flight there is the "Naiad fountain" consisting of three basins and the sculptures of water nymphs. In the middle arch of the niche you see the bust of Marie Antoinette of France. These gardens are crowned by a round temple with a statue of Venus formed after a painting by Antoine Watteau (The Embarkation for Cythera).

Landscape garden and structures in the park
The landscape garden covers an area of about 50 hectares (125 acres) and is perfectly integrated in the surrounding natural alpine landscape. There are several buildings of different appearance located in the park.

Venus Grotto
The building is wholly artificial and was built for the king as an illustration of the First Act of Wagner's Tannhäuser. Ludwig liked to be rowed over the lake in his golden swan-boat but at the same time he wanted his own blue grotto of Capri. Therefore, 24 dynamos had been installed and so already in the time of Ludwig II it was possible to illuminate the grotto in changing colours.  The grotto is closed to visitors through 2024 for reconstruction and restoration.

Hunding's Hut
This hut was inspired by Richard Wagner's directions for the First Act of the Die Walküre. Ludwig used to celebrate Germanic feasts in this house.

Gurnemanz Hermitage
Ludwig came here for contemplation every year on Good Friday. For this day he wanted a flowering meadow. If there was no such meadow because there was still snow lying, the garden director had to plant one for the king.

These three structures, the "Venus Grotto", "Hunding's Hut" and "Gurnemanz Hermitage" remind us another time of the operas of Richard Wagner. But besides that and the baroque architecture Ludwig was also interested in the oriental world.

Moorish Kiosk
This building was designed by the Berliner architect Karl von Diebitsch for the International Exhibition in Paris 1867. Ludwig II wanted to buy it but was forestalled by the railroad king Bethel Henry Strousberg. Ludwig bought the pavilion after the bankruptcy of Strousberg.
The most notable piece of furniture of this building is the peacock throne.

Moroccan House
This house was actually built in Morocco for the International Exhibition in Vienna 1873. The king bought it in 1878 and redecorated it in a more royal way.

Gallery

See also
 Buildings inspired by Versailles

References

Further reading

External links

  
 Linderhof Palace, Ludwig's favorite castle
 Linderhof Palace
 Photo Tour of Linderhof castle, more castle details.
 Linderhof tour review
 Photo Gallery of Linderhof

Museums in Bavaria
Castles in Bavaria
Palaces in Bavaria
Royal residences in Bavaria
Houses completed in 1886
Historic house museums in Germany
Gardens in Bavaria
Ludwig II of Bavaria
Buildings and structures in Garmisch-Partenkirchen (district)